Ram Dass (1931–2019) was a contemporary American spiritual teacher and former academic who wrote the 1971 bestseller Be Here Now.  

Ramdass, Ram Dass or Ram Das may also refer to:

People 
 Swami Ramdas (born Vittal Rao) (1884–1963), Indian saint, philosopher, philanthropist, and pilgrim
 Guru Ram Das (1534–1581), fourth of the ten founding Gurus of Sikhism
 Samarth Ramdas or Samartha Ramdas Swami, 17th century Indian Hindu saint, philosopher, writer and spiritual master
 Kancherla Gopanna or Bhakta Ramadasu (1620–1680), Indian devotee of Lord Rama and composer of Carnatic music
 Ramdas Rupla Gavit, Indian politician
 S. A. Ramadas, Indian politician

Fictional 
 Ram Dass, a character in the 1888 book A Little Princess by Frances Hodgson Burnett, and several adaptations of it
 Ram-Dass, a fictional mecha in the 2006 anime Strain: Strategic Armored Infantry

Other uses 
 1947 Ramdas ship disaster, when SS Ramdas sank off the coast of Mumbai
 Ramdass, a city and municipal council in Amritsar district in the Indian state of Punjab
 Ramdaspur, historic name of Amritsar, Punjab, India